Clive Edwards (born 19 January 1953, Hounslow, Middlesex, England) is a drummer, who is best known as a former member of the British band, UFO (from August 1989 to June 1993). He also featured on the Bronz second album Carried By The Storm released on 1 January 2010.

Career

Clive Edwards is probably best known for playing with hard rock bands that have included outstanding  guitarists, such as Pat Travers, Brian Robertson, former Thin Lizzy & (Wild Horses) member, Uli Jon Roth of the Scorpions (band) & (Electric Sun), Bernie Marsden of Whitesnake, John Cale from The Velvet Underground, Dennis Stratton, ex Iron Maiden, and Laurence Archer of Medicine Head, and UFO. He is now playing with Lionheart (UK band), HOUSE OF X with live shows for Frankie Miller Full House with Ray Minhinnett, Kossoff 'The Band Plays On' with Terry Slesser and Bucket & Co with Dave Colwell of Bad Company.

There are also been many other projects outside just hard rock, such as working with Academy Award winner Hans Zimmer with Zaine Griff, and also Sally Oldfield.

Edwards has played on many albums, most famously the acclaimed UFO albums High Stakes & Dangerous Men, Headstone, Lights Out in Tokyo Live and the legendary Uli Roth Earthquake. 
Edwards started playing at an early age, and formed a band with Ian Raines while they were at school together called Stallion. They made an appearance on a BBC Television show for Schools and later went on to become Rococo . A lot of this early information can be found on the Rococo web site. After the Rococo recordings, Clive has gone on to recorded and performed with HOUSE OF X, UFO, X-UFO, LOUDER LIFE LEAGUE, Bronz, Wild Horses, Pat Travers, Phil Lynott, Dave Stewart, Annie Lennox, John Cale, Ollie Halsall, Micky Moody, Bernie Marsden's SOS, Chris Thompson, Lionheart, Uli Jon Roth, Electric Sun, Neil Merryweather  and Grand Prix. The full list of recordings seen here can be found on Clive's own web pages. Playing live concerts during 2018 with bands: Kossoff the Band Plays On, Frankie Millers Full House, House of X, Lionheart, & Zaine Griff. New for 2019 there will be shows and album with the new Pete Way Band to look forward to as well as recordings for The Members & Toyah Wilcox. Brand new Lionheart album 'Reality of Miracles' for 2020.

Discography

Screaming Lord Sutch
Jack The Ripper (1975)

Rococo
Ulta Star (1973)
The Living Rock (1975)
Hoodlum Fun (1976)
Run from the Wildfire (2002)
The Firestorm and other Love songs (2011)
Losing Ground (2012)

Pat Travers Band
BBC 1 Live In Concert (1977)

Neil Merryweather
Differences (1978)

Filthy McNasty
Live - A Week at the Bridge E16 (1978)

Uli Jon Roth - Electric Sun
Earthquake (1979)
Electric Sun Compilation (1988)
Uli Jon Roth - From Here To Eternity (1998)

Wild Horses
Wild Horses (1980)
Stand Your Ground (1981)
BBC In Concert 1981
Wild Horses  – Live In Japan 1980 (2014)

Zaine Griff
Tonight (1979)
Mood Swings (2016)
The Helden Project//Spies (2022)

John Cale
For Your Neighbour's Wife (Live from Eindhoven Stadium June 21, 1980)

Bernie Marsden's SOS
Reading Rock Volume One (1982)
The Friday Rock Show Sessions (1982)

Lionheart
Unearthed - Raiders Of The Lost Archives (comp.) (1999)
Second Nature (2017)
Mary Did You Know (2018)
Reality of Miracles (2020

Bronz
Carried by the Storm 1985

Laurence Archer
Laurence Archer - L.A. (1986)

UFO
UFO - Headstone (1983)
High Stakes & Dangerous Men (1992)
Lights Out In Tokyo Live (1992)
Live TNT - UFO (1994)
Doctor Doctor (1995)
UFO The X-Factor: Out There & Back (1998)
Then and Now (2002)
One of Those Nights: The Anthology (2006)

X-UFO
X-UFO Vol. 1
The "LIVE" Files (2012)

HOUSE OF X
House of X (2014)

Toyah
In the Court of the Crimson Queen re-imagined (2019)

The Members

Versions (2019)

The Sharpeez
Live at Leo's (2020)

Crawling Spider
A Tribute to Mike Montgomery Vol.1 The LA Sessions (2020)

James Holkworth Conspiracy
Solo in Sodom (2020)
Salmon mousse blues (2021)

Compilations
Guitar Legends
Metal Gods (2005)
Metal Mania
The History of Rock
Metal
Sudden Impact (Italian metal compilation)

Videography
U.F.O. - The Story Of U.F.O. - Too Hot To Handle DVD

References

External links
Myspace.com
Ginzola.com/rococo
Tartareandesire.com
Myspace.com/wireheadrock
Interview on Rockpages.gr 2010

1953 births
Living people
English heavy metal drummers
UFO (band) members
Wild Horses (British band) members
Musicians from London
People from Hounslow